The Private World of Miss Prim is an Australian television sitcom which first screened on the Nine Network in 1966. The series followed the adventures of secretary, Miss Prim, working in the world of the children's court, who was often given to flights of fancy.

Production
The Private World of Miss Prim was supposed to run for 13 episodes but ended after 11 episodes.

The series is on the National Film and Sound Archive's 'most wanted' list, as only the pilot episode is known to have survived.

Cast
 Dawn Lake as Miss Prim 
 Owen Weingott as Tony Kendall
 Benita Collings as The Typist
 Tony Bazell as  Mr. Hardy
 Marion Johns as  Mrs. Hardy
 Moray Powell as  Managing Director Pringle

See also
 List of Australian television series

References

External links

1966 Australian television series debuts
1966 Australian television series endings
Australian television sitcoms
Nine Network original programming
Black-and-white Australian television shows
English-language television shows